Chappells (also Chappell, Chappells Bridge) is an unincorporated community, in Newberry and Saluda Counties, South Carolina, United States.

The community was named after the local Chappell family of pioneer citizens. The Moon-Dominick House and Webb-Coleman House are listed on the National Register of Historic Places.

This poor little town has been forgotten due to a tornado in the late-1800s, a flood in 1928, and re-routed roads. The downtown contained a bank, jail, and some other business.

Notes

Unincorporated communities in Newberry County, South Carolina
Unincorporated communities in Saluda County, South Carolina
Unincorporated communities in South Carolina